La Forêt enchantée (en.

History 
La Forêt enchantée was originally produced for the Imperial Ballet School's annual graduation performances. The ballet was Lev Ivanov's first original work after having recently been appointed second maître de ballet to the St. Petersburg Imperial Theatres. The ballet was also the composer and conductor Riccardo Drigo's first complete score for a full-length ballet.

La Forêt enchantée was soon transferred to the repertory of the Imperial Ballet.

Riccardo Drigo's score was received positively. The critic for the newspaper The New Time reviewed that " ... the music of this ballet is outstanding in a symphonic sense, reveals an experienced composer, a man with taste, and an excellent orchestrator. There are beautiful melodies in it, the rhythms are not overdone, and everything is listened to with pleasure from beginning to end." The score was eventually published in 1909 in piano reduction and orchestral partition by the music publisher Zimmerman.

After the performance of the Peterhof revival, the ballet was performed with regularity on the stage of the Mariinsky Theatre, becoming a favorite of many ballerinas at the turn-of-the 20th century.

Synopsis 

In an old forest in Hungary, Ilka walks with her friends. Suddenly they are taken unawares by a storm. In the confusion Ilka is separated from her friends and cannot find her way out of the forest. As the storm rages on, she becomes frightened and falls faint. She is then discovered by dryads and other forest creatures who take delight in her beauty, but they frighten her upon awakening. The Genie of the Forest enters and soon falls in love with Ilka. With the aid of the forest creatures, the Genie begs Ilka to become his queen. Upon learning that she has a human fiancé, the Genie threatens her and she falls faint again. Mortals are now approaching and the forest creatures withdraw. Peasants find Ilka. Among them is Josy, her intended, to whom she recounts her experiences with the Genie of the Forest. The ballet ends with rejoicing and dances.

Résumé of scenes and dances 
Taken from the published piano score of 1909 and Riccardo Drigo's memoirs.

Ballet fantastique in one act
№ 01 Introduction et scène
№ 02 Entrée et danse des Dryads
№ 03 L'apparition du Génie de la forêt: Scène dansante et galop
№ 04 Danse des petits Génies
№ 05 Pas d'action
№ 06 Danse des Dryads
№ 07 Variation pour la Première danseuse
№ 08 Coda-valse
№ 09 Csárdás

Footnotes

External links
 Grand pas des Éventails from the Bolshoi Ballet's production of Le Corsaire, set to music from Drigo's score for La Forêt enchantée

Ballets by Lev Ivanov
Ballets by Riccardo Drigo
1887 ballet premieres